Turneja u magnovenju 97/98 is the second live album by the Serbian punk rock band Goblini released in 1998 by Metropolis Records. The album was released as a double CD release featuring the reissue of Istinite priče I deo.

Track listing

Personnel 
 Vlada Kokotović — bass
 Zoran Jević "Fric" — drums
 Alen Jovanović — guitar
 Branko Golubović "Golub" — vocals
 Saša Šetka — guitar
 Leo Fon Punkerstain — guitar (1996 dates)
 D. Vartabedijan — artwork by [design]
 Leo Fon Punkerstein — artwork by [design]
 N. Stanković — artwork by [Design], photography

References 
 Turneja u magnovenju 97/98 at Discogs
 EX YU ROCK enciklopedija 1960-2006, Janjatović Petar; 

1998 live albums
Live punk rock albums
Goblini albums
Metropolis Records (Serbia) live albums